Holy Trinity Episcopal Church is an Episcopal church in the Historic District of the Fisher Park neighborhood of Greensboro, North Carolina.

History 
In 1869, St. Barnabas Church was founded as Greensboro's first Episcopal parish. Construction of the first church building got underway on May 31, 1871 on the site now occupied by the Elon University School of Law.

In 1891, a group of parishioners split off to form St. Andrew's Episcopal Mission, which was designated a parish in 1893. In May 1910 the two parishes consolidated to form Holy Trinity Episcopal Church. The congregation worshiped at St. Barnabas Church for two years, then split again to form St. Andrew's Episcopal Church and Holy Trinity Episcopal Church.

A parish house designed by Hobart Upjohn was built on the current site at Greene Street and Fisher Avenue in 1919. Its assembly hall was converted into All Saints Chapel in 1930. Construction began on the current sanctuary in 1949, using funds raised by parishioners. Further construction projects took place in the 1960s and 1990s.

References 

Churches in Greensboro, North Carolina
Episcopal church buildings in North Carolina
Christian organizations established in 1910